The Boston Transit Commission Building is an historic office building at 15 Beacon Street in Boston, Massachusetts. It served as the headquarters of the Boston Transit Commission, the nation's first public transportation agency, which was responsible for the initial creation of Boston's subway system, now operated by the commission's successor, the Massachusetts Bay Transportation Authority (MBTA).

History
The ten-story Beaux Arts or Classical Revival building was designed by William Gibbons Preston and built in 1903–04 on the site of the 1722-built mansion of merchant Edward Bromfield. 

The commission occupied the building until it went out of existence in 1916. The city took the property in 1920 by eminent domain, and used it to house the Boston School Committee. The city sold the building in 1998, and it has been converted into XV Beacon, a 63-room luxury hotel which is a member of the Historic Hotels of America.  The hotel features art works by Jules Olitski, Gilbert Stuart, Maggi Brown, Martha Lloyd, Joe Greene, Tony Evanko, Ben Freeman, and others.

The building was listed on the National Register of Historic Places in 2007.

See also
 Boston Transit Building (360 Newbury Street)
 National Register of Historic Places listings in northern Boston, Massachusetts

References

External links

XV Beacon web site

Government buildings on the National Register of Historic Places in Massachusetts
National Register of Historic Places in Boston
Skyscraper hotels in Boston
Hotels in Boston
Neoclassical architecture in Massachusetts
Beaux-Arts architecture in Massachusetts
Historic Hotels of America
Government buildings in Boston